Radio in the Philippines refers to radio programs, radio stations, and radio broadcasting organizations in the country. Estimates on the number or radio stations range from 1,200 to 1,500.

Radio in the Philippines started in 1924 with the establishment of KZKZ (AM) in Manila, Philippines by Henry Herman Sr., owner of the Electrical Supply Company in Manila. Henry Herman was an American and a former soldier who came to the Philippines to fight in the Philippine–American War. He stayed in the Philippines after he was discharged.

This was not the first test however. Archives suggest that in 1922, an American woman named Mrs. Redgrave used a five-watt transmitter for a test broadcast from Nichols Field (now Villamor Airbase). This test is possibly the first radio broadcast in Asia.

Henry Herman's station originally broadcast using a 5-watt transmitter. In 1924, it boosted its power to 100 watts. On October 4, 1924, Henry Herman transferred KZKZ's ownership to the Radio Corporation of the Philippines (RCP), which he himself organized. In 1926 the company began to work on constructing two of the largest radio stations in Asia with the idea of maintaining direct Manila-San Francisco service. After Philippine independence, it changed its callsign to DWKZ, but changed in 1960 to DZCA.

In 1929, RCP launched KZRC in Cebu broadcasting with a 100-watt transmitter, but was later sold to store owner Isaac Beck. It is now DYRC owned by the Manila Broadcasting Company.

Early on, all radio programs were in English. This was the American Colonial Era in the Philippines. Most shows resembled American shows, even copying sponsorship.

Radio was unregulated until 1931 when the Radio Control Board was established under the Insular Government.

Upon the declaration of martial law in 1972, the dictatorship of Ferdinand Marcos shut down and took over radio stations and other media organizations. Only media outlets owned by cronies were allowed to operate, such as Kanlaon Broadcasting System owned by Marcos crony Roberto Benedicto. Other media outlets were later allowed to operate under heavy censorship. The emergence of alternative media outlets would eventually play a role in the downfall of the dictatorship during the 1986 People Power Revolution.

The current oldest continuously operating radio station is DZRB-AM. Another old station would be DZRH, started as KZRH.

Broadcast code of the Philippines 
The Philippine Broadcast Code was issued by the Kapisanan ng mga Brodkaster ng Pilipinas (KBP) in 2007, which sets standards of performance and ethical conduct for the broadcast of radio and television stations for KBP member broadcasters and organizations.

Violence against journalists 

Acts of violence against radio commentators and other members of the media are monitored by human rights organizations and media watchdogs, such as the Center for Media Freedom and Responsibility and the National Union of Journalists of the Philippines.

See also
Mass media in the Philippines
List of radio stations in the Philippines

References